The blotched chub (Erimystax insignis) is a species of fish in the family Cyprinidae, the minnow and carp family. This fish species in native to the Southeastern region of the United States.

Appearance 
The blotched chub is a slender, silvery minnow with dark 'I' shaped vertical patches along the lateral portion of the body.

Distribution and habitat
This species is found primarily in the Cumberland and Tennessee River drainages of southern states. Although, a subspecies is known to inhabit the Upper Tennessee and the Ridge and Valley region. The majority of the Tennessee River is inhabited by the blotched chub and its subspecies.

The blotched chub's preferred habitat is the clear riffle areas of small creeks. These areas must have plenty of substrate, which is required for this species to spawn.

Ecology 
Spawning season for this fish is at its highest in the months of March and April, when water temperatures reach . Though, this may vary from year to year depending upon factors such as, rain amounts, sedimentation, and surrounding environmental temperatures. It has been found that this species typically spawns earlier than that of others in the family Cyprinidae.

References

Erimystax
Freshwater fish of the United States
Fish described in 1956
Taxa named by Carl Leavitt Hubbs